Mr. Music Man or Mister Music Man may refer to:

Music
 Kojo Antwi, a Ghanaian Afro pop, highlife and reggae musical artist

Albums
 Mr. Music Man, 1981 album by Val Doonican
 Mr. Music Man, 1978 album by Al Campbell
 Mr. Music Man, a 1995 album by Ghanaian musician Kojo Antwi

Songs
 "Mister Music Man", French-language Eurovision entry for Switzerland 1992
 "Mr. Music Man", by The King Blues from Under the Fog, 2006
 "Mr. Music Man", by Tommy Edwards, 1958
 "Mr. Music Man", by Labelle from Pressure Cookin', 1973

Other
 Mr Music Man: My Life in Showbiz, an autobiography by Mervyn Conn

See also 
"Hey! Mr. Music Man",	a song by Peters and Lee, 1976
"Please Mr. Music Man", a song by Harry Nilsson from Early Tymes